Bipra Noapara is a census town in Domjur CD Block of Howrah Sadar subdivision in Howrah district in the Indian state of West Bengal. It is a part of Kolkata Urban Agglomeration.

Geography
Bipra Noapara is located at

Demographics
As per 2011 Census of India Bipra Noapara had a total population of 9,408 of which 4,753 (50%) were males and 4,665 (50%) were females. Population below 6 years was 1,010. The total number of literates in Bipra Noapara was 6,673 (79.46% of the population over 6 years).

Bipra Noapara was part of Kolkata Urban Agglomeration in 2011 census.
   
 India census, Bipra Noapara had a population of 8,996. Males constitute 54% of the population and females 46%. Bipra Noapara has an average literacy rate of 67%, higher than the national average of 59.5%; with male literacy of 74% and female literacy of 58%. 11% of the population is under 6 years of age.

Transport
Makardaha railway station and Domjur Road railway station are the nearest railway stations.

References

Cities and towns in Howrah district
Neighbourhoods in Kolkata
Kolkata Metropolitan Area